Chelsy Yvonne Davy (born 13 October 1985) is a Zimbabwean businesswoman who is the owner and founder of the jewellery brand "Aya" and the travel agency "Aya Africa".

Early life 
Davy was born in Bulawayo, Zimbabwe, to Charles Davy, a South African safari farmer, and Beverley Donald Davy, a former Coca-Cola model and winner of the 1973 Miss Rhodesia contest. She has a younger brother, Shaun, and grew up at her family's homestead in the Lemco Safari Area.

Her father Charles was one of the largest private landowners in Zimbabwe, and was reported to own  of land. He maintained business ties with controversial politician Webster Shamu, of whom he has said, "I am in partnership with a person who I personally like and get along with. I am not involved in politics in any way." After being criticised by the press, however, Davy sold his share in the business.

Career

Education 

Davy was briefly educated at Cheltenham College. Prior to this she attended Girls College in Bulawayo, Zimbabwe  (not Cheltenham Ladies' College as has been widely reported), before moving to Stowe School in Buckinghamshire. She received a bachelor's degree in economics from the University of Cape Town in 2006, and a law degree (LLB) from University of Leeds in 2009. In September 2011, Davy began work as a trainee solicitor at London law firm Allen & Overy.
In late 2014, however, Davy decided to quit her position at the firm.

Jewellery

After studying at the Gemological Institute of America, Davy launched a jewellery brand, Aya, in July 2016.

Travel
In 2020, Davy announced that Aya would be branching out into the luxury travel sector to organise African holidays, in an interview with Tatler Magazine. She then announced the launch of Aya Africa on Instagram.

Personal life

Davy married hotelier Sam Cutmore-Scott and gave birth to their son, Leo, in early 2022.

Relationship with Prince Harry 
Davy had what the press described as a "turbulent" relationship with Prince Harry, a member of the British royal family.  The pair met in early 2004 while Davy was a boarder at Stowe School, and were in an on-again, off-again couple until May 2010. Davy announced the end of the relationship on Facebook.

In 2011, addressing rumours of a possible reconciliation, Prince Harry publicly professed himself "100 percent single", and Chelsy, who attended the wedding of Prince William and Catherine Middleton on 29 April 2011, stated that she would not marry Prince Harry due to the rising incompatibility of their life choices within the relationship.

In May 2018, Davy was a guest at the wedding of Prince Harry and American actress Meghan Markle.

In November 2021, private investigator Gavin Burrows claimed on a BBC documentary that Davy's communications were targeted and her voicemails were hacked in an attempt by media outlets to gather information on Prince Harry, an act for which he apologised. Burrow's claims "are yet to be tested in court and are strongly disputed" by The Sun and the now-defunct News of the World.

References

External links 
 Aya
 Aya Africa
 

1985 births
Alumni of the University of Leeds
Living people
White Zimbabwean people
People educated at Stowe School
People from Bulawayo
University of Cape Town alumni
Allen & Overy people
21st-century businesswomen
Zimbabwean women in business
Zimbabwean women lawyers